Othman Al-Aqib (Arabic:عثمان العاقب) (born 17 January 1991) is a Qatari footballer. He currently plays as a left back .

External links
 

Qatari footballers
1991 births
Living people
Al-Sailiya SC players
Mesaimeer SC players
Qatar Stars League players
Qatari Second Division players
Association football fullbacks